The Anthem of the Yamalo-Nenets Autonomous Okrug is one of the national symbols of Yamalo-Nenets Autonomous Okrug, a federal subject of Russia, along with its flag and coat of arms. The Russian lyrics of the anthem were written by Lyudmila Khodunova, and the anthem's music was composed by Yuri Yunkerov, both in 2010. It was officially adopted on 17 November 2010.

Lyrics

References

Russian anthems
Regional songs
European anthems
Culture of Yamalo-Nenets Autonomous Okrug
National anthem compositions in F major